Henschleben is a village and a former municipality in the Sömmerda district of Thuringia, Germany. Since December 2019, it is part of the municipality Straußfurt.

References

Sömmerda (district)
Former municipalities in Thuringia